This article lists sovereign countries, territories, and supranational unions by Nobel laureates per capita. The figures include all Nobel Prizes awarded to individuals up to and including 14 October 2019. Population figures are the current values, and the number of laureates is given per 10 million. Only sovereign countries are ranked; unranked entities are marked in italics.

All prizes
All five prizes (Chemistry, Literature, Peace, Physics, and Physiology or Medicine) and the Nobel Memorial Prize in Economic Sciences are considered.

By United Nations geoscheme

Scientific prizes

Only the awards for Chemistry, Physics, Physiology or Medicine, and the Nobel Memorial Prize in Economic Sciences are considered.

Inclusion criteria
The list of Nobel laureates by country was compiled by BBC News using the following criteria:
 Prizes are allocated to the country or countries stated on the winner's biography on the website of the Nobel Prize committee (www.nobelprize.org).
 Where the website mentions multiple countries in relation to a prize winner (country of birth; country of citizenship; country of residence at time of award) each of those countries is credited as having won the prize.
 Where a prize has multiple winners, the country (or countries) of each winner are credited.
 Prizes which were declined by the winner are included.
 Prizes won by organisations are not allocated to countries.
 Winners from Belarus and Ukraine are not credited to Russia. Winners born in what was then Poland but is now Ukraine are credited to Poland.

The BBC News figures included all Nobel Prizes awarded up to and including 8 October 2010. Nobel prizes announced after that date were added generally following the same criteria outlined above.

Corrections

This is a list of corrections made to the original figures provided by BBC News:
 No award was attributed to Luxembourg, but, according to the Nobel Prize website, Gabriel Lippmann (Physics, 1908) was born in that country.
 No award was attributed to Azerbaijan, but, according to the Nobel Prize website, Lev Landau (Physics, 1962) was born in the area that is now held by that country (then part of the Russian Empire). The justification for this correction is that BBC News did credit Latvia for Wilhelm Ostwald's 1909 Chemistry Prize, even though his birthplace—Latvia's capital Riga—was by the time he was born (1853) also part of the Russian Empire.
 Australia was credited with only one Nobel laureate in Physics, but up to and including 8 October 2010 there were three Physics laureates associated with that country: William Lawrence Bragg (1915) and Aleksandr Prokhorov (1964), were both born there according to the Nobel Prize website. William Henry Bragg lived a significant portion of his life in Australia and while Australian citizenship did not exist until 1949 (after Bragg's death), he would have met the requirements to be an Australian citizen had it existed during the period during his lifetime.
 BBC News correctly acknowledges South Korea as having two Nobel laureates associated with that country, but due an error in its spreadsheet only one of them is assigned to a particular prize (Peace, 2000). The one that was not specified is Charles J. Pedersen (Chemistry, 1987), who was born in Busan, according to the Nobel Prize website.

See also
List of Nobel laureates 
List of Nobel laureates by country
List of Jewish Nobel laureates
List of Christian Nobel laureates 
List of Muslim Nobel laureates 
List of nonreligious Nobel laureates

References

Further reading

External links
 All Nobel Laureates
 Graph of Nobel shares by country (yearly cumulative)

capita

Nobel